Discrete modelling is the discrete analogue of continuous modelling.  In discrete modelling, formulae are fit to discrete data—data that could potentially take on only a countable set of values, such as the integers, and which are not infinitely divisible.  A common method in this form of modelling is to use recurrence relations.

Applied mathematics